The foreign relations of Thailand are handled by the Ministry of Foreign Affairs of Thailand.

Thailand participates fully in international and regional organizations. It has developed close ties with other ASEAN members—Indonesia, Malaysia, the Philippines, Singapore, Brunei, Laos, Cambodia, Myanmar, and Vietnam—whose foreign and economic ministers hold annual meetings. Regional cooperation is progressing in economic, trade, banking, political, and cultural matters. In 2003, Thailand served as APEC host. Dr. Supachai Panitchpakdi, the former Deputy Prime Minister of Thailand, served as Secretary-General of the United Nations Conference on Trade and Development (UNCTAD) from 2005 until 31 August 2013. In 2005 Thailand attended the inaugural East Asia Summit.

Since the military coup of May 2014, Thailand's global reputation has plunged, according to Professor Thitinan Pongsudhirak of Chulalongkorn University. He maintains that, "When the fourth anniversary of Thailand's coup comes to pass later this month [May 2018], Thailand's foreign relations will be one of the many costs to be counted from the military government....Instead of moving ahead in its relations with the outside world, Thailand has regressed to a standstill.

Disputes
Parts of the border with Laos are undefined. A maritime boundary dispute with Vietnam was resolved, August 1997. Parts of maritime border with Cambodia are disputed. Sporadic conflict with Myanmar over alignment of border.

Diplomatic relations

Former diplomatic relations:

1. (19 December 1950 - 30 April 1975)

2. (23 January 1946 - 1 July 1975)

3. (3 September 1974 - 3 October 1990)

4. (14 June 1987 - 22 May 1990)

Asia

Bangladesh

Relations are considered close and cordial and have made strides to improve trade and investment between the two countries. Diplomatic relations were established on 5 October 1972 and Thailand opened its embassy in 1974 followed by Bangladesh setting up their own in Bangkok in the following year. The first visit between the two countries was President Ziaur Rahman's visit to Thailand in 1979 followed by Prime Minister Prem Tinsulanonda in 1983. Other Heads of States like Ershad visited in 1985, 1988 and 1990 and Thaksin Shinawatra in July and December 2002 and January 2004. Thailand is a key country in Bangladesh's "Look East" policy and relations have begun to increase and diversify into different areas.

They seek not to intervene in each other's internal matters as shown by their response to the events occurring in their own respective countries in 2006 such as the 2006 Thai coup d'état and 2006–2008 Bangladeshi political crisis. Both have considerable cooperation in summits organised by BIMSTEC and the ASEAN regional forum. Upper class and upper middle class Bangladeshis often go to Thailand for medical treatment and operations that the country's medical infrastructure cannot provide.

Brunei

Brunei has an embassy in Bangkok, and Thailand has an embassy in Bandar Seri Begawan. The relations have always been close and cordial.

Cambodia
 

Parts of Cambodia's border with Thailand are indefinite, and the maritime boundary with Thailand is not clearly defined. On 5 November 2009 Thailand recalled its ambassador from Cambodia in protest of the Cambodian government's appointment of Thai ex-leader Thaksin Shinawatra as an economic adviser. Thai Prime Minister Abhisit Vejjajiva stated that this was "the first diplomatic retaliation measure" against the appointment. He also said that Cambodia was interfering in Thai internal affairs and as a result bi-lateral co-operation agreements would be reviewed. The Cambodian government has stated that it would refuse any extradition request from Thailand for Thaksin as it considered him to be a victim of political persecution.

In the months leading up to the Cambodian decision, troops from both nations had clashed over territory claimed by both countries immediately adjacent to Cambodia's Preah Vihear temple, leading to a deterioration in relations. At 20:30 on 5 November Cambodia announced that it was withdrawing its ambassador from Thailand as a retaliatory measure. Sok An, a member of the Council of Ministers and Deputy Prime Minister of Cambodia, said that the appointment of Thaksin is a decision internal to Cambodia and that it "conforms to international practice". The mutual withdrawal of ambassadors is the most severe diplomatic action to have occurred between the two countries.

China

Thailand established diplomatic relations with the PRC on 1 July 1975. It remains as a key regional ally of China, with growing cooperation between both countries.

For an evaluation of Sino-Siamese relations, see Siamese Inter-State Relations in the Late Nineteenth Century: From An Asian Regional Perspective.

India

Diplomatic relations between India and Thailand were established in 1947, soon after India gained independence. Thailand maintains three diplomatic posts in India: in Mumbai, in New Delhi, and in Calcutta. India maintains three enclaves in Thailand: in Bangkok, Chiang Mai, and A Muang.

The end of the Cold War led to a significant enhancement in the substance and pace of bilateral interactions. Indian Look East policy from 1993 and Thailand's Look West policy since 1996 set the stage for a substantive consolidation of bilateral relations. The past few years since 2001 have witnessed growing warmth, increasing economic and commercial links, exchange of high-level visits on both sides, and the signing of a large number of Agreements leading to a further intensification of relations. Thailand and India are cooperating in various multilateral fora like India's dialogue partnership with ASEAN, the ASEAN Regional Forum (ARF), and the East Asia Summit, the sub-regional grouping BIMSTEC involving Bangladesh, India, Sri Lanka, Thailand, Myanmar, Nepal and Bhutan, and trilateral transport linkages with Thailand, Myanmar and India. India is a member of the Asia Cooperation Dialogue (ACD) initiated by Thailand in 2002 and of the Mekong–Ganga Cooperation (MGC), a group of six countries.

Indonesia

Indonesia and Thailand are viewed as natural allies. The nations established diplomatic ties in 1950 and have enjoyed a cordial relationship since. Both countries have established embassies. Indonesia has its embassy in Bangkok and a consulate in Songkhla, while Thailand has its embassy in Jakarta. State visits have been conducted for years. Both nations are the founders of ASEAN and the members of Non-Aligned Movement and APEC. Indonesia is also appointed as observer in Cambodian–Thai border dispute.

Iran

Israel

Israel and Thailand have had official relations since June 1954. The Israeli embassy in Bangkok was established in 1958. Since 1996, Thailand has had an embassy in Tel Aviv. After the floods in 2011, Israel sent water management experts to Thailand. Princess Chulabhorn Mahidol is involved in advancing scientific cooperation between the two countries. The Thai ambassador to Israel is Jukr Boon-Long.

Japan

Japan has become a key trading partner and foreign investor for Thailand. Japan is Thailand's largest supplier, followed by the United States. Since 2005, the rapid ramp-up in export of automobiles of Japanese makes (esp. Toyota, Nissan, Isuzu) has helped to dramatically improve the trade balance, with over 1 million cars produced last year.  As such, Thailand has joined the ranks of the world's top ten automobile exporting nations. In 2007, a Japan–Thailand Economic Partnership Agreement was signed, aiming at free trade between the two countries after a transition period of 10 years.

Laos

In some respects, Thailand can be seen as a greater threat to Laos's independence than Vietnam because of its closer cultural affinity, its easier access, and its control over the railroad and highway routes to the sea. The Mekong River, which both sides have an interest in making a "river of true peace and friendship" — as their respective prime ministers called for in 1976 – also provides a north–south artery during the rainy season.

Malaysia

Thailand has an embassy in Kuala Lumpur, and consulate-general offices in George Town and Kota Bharu. Malaysia maintains an embassy in Bangkok. Recently, Thai-Malay relations have soured considerably due to the ethnically Malay Pattani separatists in three southern provinces of Thailand. There have been claims by some Thai politicians that certain parties in Malaysia has taken an interest in the cause of their opponents in the war, which is vehemently disputed by the latter.

Myanmar

Pakistan

In August 2013, the Thai Prime Minister Yingluck Shinawatra visited Pakistan in the first visit in a decade.

Palestine

Thailand officially recognised Palestine as an independent state on 18 January 2012.

Philippines

Thai-Philippines relations continue to be friendly. Relations with Thailand were established 14 June 1949. Thailand is one of the Philippines major trading partners and one of the Philippines' rice suppliers. Relations continues to be strengthened through talks and agreements on economic, security, and cultural matters including concerns on rice trading, and combatting drugs and human trafficking.

Saudi Arabia

Relations Saudi Arabia and Thailand were established in 1957 and hundreds of thousands of Thais went to Saudi Arabia to work. However, relations have been severely strained for the past 20 years due to fallout from the Blue Diamond Affair.  Diplomatic missions were downgraded to chargé d'affaires level and the number of Thai workers in Saudi Arabia plummeted. Saudi Arabia does not issue working visas for Thais and discourages its citizens from visiting the country.

On January 26, 2022, both countries announced they restored full diplomatic relations and would appoint ambassadors.

South Korea

Both countries established diplomatic relations on 1 October 1958. The year 2008 is the 50th year of bilateral relations with two nations. During the Korean War, Thailand was the second nation sending troops for supporting South Korea just after the United States. In October 2003, South Korea president Roh Moo-hyun visited Thailand while Prime Minister Thaksin Shinawatra went to Seoul in November 2005. South Korean is the 10th largest trade partner, which is about to reach the scale of 10 billion dollars.

Vietnam

Diplomatic relations between the two countries have existed since 1976, and are very friendly both economically and politically nowadays. Yet, relations between the two countries had always been marred by discord, which resulted from bitter rivalry to gain control of the area of what is today Laos and Cambodia.

In the 19th century, Thailand (then known as Siam) had fought a series of wars with the Nguyễn dynasty which then ruled over Vietnam over control of Cambodia. This rivalry will only temporarily subside when French colonists stepped in and gradually building an establishment in Southeast Asia, known as French Indochina.

During the Vietnam War, Thailand was aligned with South Vietnam and the United States and the U Tapao Air Base was used as a base for USAF aircraft. During the Fall of Saigon in 1975, fleeing South Vietnamese pilots arrived at U Tapao before fleeing to other countries.

In 1979, when the Khmer Rouge government in neighbouring Cambodia was toppled, this had raised concerns in Thailand and the Thai government quickly allied itself with the Khmer Rouge, later the CGDK, in fear of Vietnamese expansionism. In fact, Thailand was foremost among the ASEAN, of which it is part of, in opposing the Vietnamese invasion of Cambodia.

Cambodian refugees soon stayed at border camps straddling the Thai-Cambodian border, and these camps are often controlled by the Khmer Rouge or the CGDK. In the years that followed, Vietnam launched a series of raids on the camps and Vietnamese troops often penetrated into Thai territory and shelled Thai border villages and towns.

Americas

Europe

Oceania

Thai diplomatic missions

Royal Thai embassies and consulates

Permanent missions

Thailand economic and trade office

International organization participation
APEC, AsDB, ASEAN, BIMSTEC, CP, ESCAP, FAO, G-77, IAEA, IBRD, ICAO, ICFTU, ICRM, IDA, IFAD, IFC, IFRCS, IHO, ILO, IMF, IMO, Inmarsat, Intelsat, Interpol, IOC, IOM, ISO, ITU, NAM, OAS (observer), OPCW, PCA, UN, UNCTAD, UNESCO, UNHCR, UNIDO, UNIKOM, UNITAR, UNMIBH, UNTAET, UNU, UPU, WCL, WCO, WFTU, WHO, WIPO, WMO, WToO, WTrO

See also

 List of ambassadors of Thailand to Chile
 List of ambassadors of Thailand to Mexico
 List of diplomatic missions in Thailand

References

Further reading

 Busbarat, Pongphisoot. "Thailand's foreign policy towards neighbouring countries and ASEAN."  in Routledge Handbook of Contemporary Thailand (Routledge, 2019) pp. 431–446.
 Chachavalpongpun, Pavin. Reinventing Thailand: Thaksin and his foreign policy (Institute of Southeast Asian Studies, 2010).
 Chambers, Paul, and Poowin Bunyavejchewin. "Thailand's foreign economic policy toward mainland Southeast Asia." (2019). online
 Guan, Ang Cheng. Southeast Asia's cold war: An interpretive history (U of Hawaii Press, 2018).
 Klein, Ira. "Salisbury, Rosebery, and the Survival of Siam." Journal of British Studies 8.1 (1968): 119-139. in 1890s
 Phuangkasem, Corrine. Thailand's Foreign Relations: 1964-80 (Brookfield Publishing Company, 1984).
 
 Suwannathat-Pian, Kobkua. Thai-Malay relations: traditional intra-regional relations from the seventeenth to the early twentieth centuries (Oxford University Press, USA, 1988).
 Theeravit, Khien. "Thailand: An Overview of Politics and Foreign Relations." Southeast Asian Affairs (1979): 299-311. online
 Theeravit, Khien. "Thai-Kampuchean Relations: Problems and Prospects." Asian Survey, 22#6 1982, pp. 561–576. online for Cambodia
 Zawacki, Benjamin. Thailand: Shifting ground between the U.S. and a rising China (2nd ed. . Bloomsbury, 2021).

External links
   Ministry of Foreign Affairs of Thailand
 Foreign Embassies in Thailand